Music Videos IV is a DVD recorded by the French singer Mylène Farmer, containing all the singer's videoclips from 2001 to 2006. It was released in October 2006 in France.

This DVD includes the videos of the three singles from the best of Les Mots and those of the five singles from the sixth studio album Avant que l'ombre.... The cover uses an image from the single's video "Les Mots".

Formats

This video is available only on DVD.

Chart performance
In France, the DVD went straight to number one on November 4, 2006, with 10,883 sales, its best weekly sales. It stayed for 5 weeks in the Top 10 and 29 weeks on Top 40. It disappeared from the chart June 16, 2007. With a total of 39,575 sales in 2006, the DVD peaked at number 11 on the Annual Videos Chart.

Track listings

Bonus: Shoot It All (making-of "Fuck Them All")

Credits and personnel
 "Les Mots", "Pardonne-moi", "Fuck Them All": Produced by Laurent Boutonnat
 "C'est une belle journée", "L'amour n'est rien...": Produced by Benoît Di Sabatino
 "Q.I": Produced by Benoît Lestang
 "Redonne-moi": Produced by François Hanss
 "Peut-être toi": Produced by Kusumi Naoko

Charts

References

Mylène Farmer video albums
2006 video albums